Pursuit  is a one-hour American television anthology drama series which aired live on CBS from October 22, 1958, to January 14, 1959.

Overview
As the program's title implies, each episode focused on a person or group that was being pursued. 

Plans for the program were under way in December 1957, with Charles Russell moving from New York to the West Coast of the United States to produce the show. Writers engaged in the project were Charles Larsen, Jonathan Latimer, Don Sanford, Robert Soderberg, and Hagar Wilde. The program's pilot, "The Lady Died at Midnight" starred Earl Holliman and was broadcast on February 23, 1958. 

Russell and Eva Wolas alternated weeks as producers, and the Mennen company had full sponsorship on alternate weeks.

Episodes
Among the presentations were "Kiss Me Again, Stranger", starring Jeffrey Hunter and Margaret O'Brien, "Epitaph For a Golden Girl" starring Michael Rennie, Rip Torn, and Sally Forrest, and Rod Serling's "The Last Night of August", starring Franchot Tone and Dennis Hopper and written by Rod Serling. Other episodes included "Tiger on a Bicycle" (November 12, 1958), with Laraine Day, Dan Duryea, Chester Morris, David Ladd, and Neville Brand, and "The Vengeance" (October 22, 1958), with Sal Mineo, Stu Erwin, Carol Lynley, Macdonald Carey, Vivian Nathan, and Robert Harris.

Some of the actors who were cast in the episodes included: Robert Alda, Martin Balsam, Lew Ayres, John Cassavetes, Joan Caulfield, Jackie Cooper, and Whitney Blake.

References

External links
 
 at CVTA with list of episodes

1958 American television series debuts
1959 American television series endings
1950s American anthology television series
1950s American crime drama television series
Black-and-white American television shows
CBS original programming
American live television series
English-language television shows